Eupogonius hagmanni is a species of beetle in the family Cerambycidae. It was described by Melzer in 1927. It is known from Brazil.

References

Eupogonius
Beetles described in 1927